This is a list of law schools in Iraq.

Al-Mustansiriya University / College of Law
Al-Nahrain University / College of Law
Al Qadissiya University / College of Law
Diyala University / College of Law
Karbala University / College of Law
Kirkuk University / College of Law
Misan University / College of Law
Salahaddin University / College of Law
Thi Qar University / College of Law
University of Anbar / College of Law
University of Babylon / College of Law
University of Baghdad / College of Law
University of Basrah / College of Law
University of Dohuk / College of Law
University of Koya / College of Law
University of Kufa / College of Law
University of Kurdistan - Hawler / College of Law
University of Mosul / College of Law
University of Sulaimani / College of Law
University of Tikrit / College of Law
Wassit University / College of Law

Iraq

Law faculties